General elections were held in Suriname on 25 May 1991. The result was a victory for the New Front for Democracy and Development (an alliance of the National Party of Suriname, the Progressive Reform Party, the Party for National Unity and Solidarity and the Surinamese Labour Party), which won 30 of the 51 seats. Voter turnout was 69.3%

Results

Notes

References

Suriname
Elections in Suriname
1991 in Suriname